Bodilopsis sordidus, commonly known as the Brown domino beetle, is a species of scarab beetle found in the Palearctic. This species was formerly a member of the genus Aphodius.

Subspecies
These two subspecies belong to the species Bodilopsis sordidus:
 Bodilopsis sordidus changajicus (Endrödi, 1965)  (Mongolia)
 Bodilopsis sordidus sordidus (Fabricius, 1775)  (Palearctic)

References

Scarabaeidae
Beetles described in 1775
Beetles of Europe
Taxa named by Johan Christian Fabricius